Egher may refer to:

 Egher (Batar), a river in Romania and Ukraine
 Egher (Tur), a river in Romania
 Egherul Mare, a river in Romania and Hungary